Ejective-contour clicks, also called sequential linguo-glottalic consonants, are consonants that transition from a click to an ejective sound, or more precisely, have an audible delay between the front and rear release of the click. All click types (alveolar , dental , lateral , palatal , retroflex , and labial ) have linguo-glottalic variants, which occur as both stops and affricates, and may be voiced. At least a voiceless linguo-glottalic affricate is attested from all Khoisan languages of southern Africa (the Khoe, Tuu, and Kx'a language families), as well as from the Bantu language Yeyi from the same area, but they are unattested elsewhere.

Analysis
Traditionally, contour clicks were believed to be uvular in their rear articulation, whereas non-contour clicks were thought to be velar. However, it is now known that all clicks are uvular, at least in the languages which have been investigated, and that the articulation of these clicks is more complex than that of others but no different in location. Linguists now analyze them as either contours (that is, as a transition from one kind of sound to another within a single consonant) or as sequences of a click followed by a uvular consonant (that is, as consonant clusters). See pulmonic-contour clicks for discussion.

Description
Phonetically, a linguo-glottalic consonant is a click in which the forward and rear articulations are released independently. The forward articulation, made with the lips or the front of the tongue, releases with a lingual airstream as in any click. The rear articulation, however, is held longer, and when it is released, it is with a glottalic airstream. (Linguo-pulmonic consonants are similar, except that the second release is pulmonic, as in English consonants.) That is, such consonants have a double release burst, one ingressive (the air pulled in by the tongue) and the other egressive (the air pushed out by the glottis). The rear articulation is involved in both: it helps create the suction that powers the first, and then is itself released for the second. Because the back of the tongue operates in the uvular or pharyngeal part of the mouth to generate the first burst, and the two bursts are very close together in time, the second release is articulated in approximately this same area.

Types
Four series of ejective-contour clicks (as classified by the rear release) are attested. There are two manners of articulation (stop and fricative) and two voicing contrasts, each of which is found for each of the places of articulation (as classified by the front release) that clicks use.

Linguo-glottalic stops
In linguo-glottalic stops, the rear articulation is released into a ejective stop. Although ejective stops are necessarily voiceless, click–ejective contours may be voiced, as the voicing during the articulation of the first (click) release is stopped for the second (ejective) release.

Linguo-glottalic affricates
The rear articulation may also be released as a fricative. However, because the forward articulation may be considered a stop, these are called affricates rather than fricatives. There are two conventions for writing the frication: the English convention, with an x, and the Afrikaans tradition, with a g. Both are used in the orthographies of Khoisan languages. In Juǀ’hõa, for example, they are written voiceless ǃk ǁk ǀk ǂk and voiced gǃk gǁk gǀk gǂk, and in the old orthography qg’ xg’ cg’ çg’ and dqg’ dxg’ dcg’ dçg’; in Naro, they are (voiceless) qg’ xg’ cg’ tcg’, and in Khoekhoe (Korana), ǃkh’ ǁkh’ ǀkh’ ǂkh’.

Miller (2011) distinguishes between two kinds of affricates: homorganic, where the rear articulation has the same uvular place in its release as it held during the front release, and heterorganic, where it is either velar or epiglottal. Although no language contrasts these possibilities from homorganic affricates, she holds that they are different enough in sound that considering them to be different consonants is useful.

See also
Pulmonic-contour click
Glottalized click
Nasal click

References

 Amanda Miller, 2011. "The Representation of Clicks". In Oostendorp et al. eds., The Blackwell Companion to Phonology.

Click consonants